Three Lakes is an unincorporated census-designated place located in the town of Three Lakes, Oneida County, Wisconsin, United States. Three Lakes has a post office with ZIP code 54562. As of the 2010 census, its population is 605.

History
A post office called Three Lakes has been in operation since 1885. The community was named from its location near three lakes.  As an early railroad was being surveyed, the surveyors had to backtrack and re-route the tracks two times to get around the three lakes.  The explanation penciled in on the surveyor's map was 'three lakes', hence where the town got its name.  The three lakes the town is named for are Maple Lake, Town Line Lake and Range Lake.

See also
 List of census-designated places in Wisconsin

References

External links

Census-designated places in Oneida County, Wisconsin
Census-designated places in Wisconsin